Pachystylidium is a genus of plant of the family Euphorbiaceae. It contains only one known species, Pachystylidium hirsutum, found in eastern India, Indochina, the Philippines, Sulawesi, the Lesser Sunda Islands, and Java.

References

Plukenetieae
Flora of Asia
Monotypic Euphorbiaceae genera